Autan (also spelled Otan, Awtan or Wetan) is a village in northern Syria located northwest of Homs in the Homs Governorate. According to the Syria Central Bureau of Statistics, Autan had a population of 583 in the 2004 census. Its inhabitants are predominantly Maronites.

References

Bibliography

 

Populated places in Homs District
Christian communities in Syria
Maronite communities